DSLite may refer to:

Nintendo DS Lite, a dual-screen handheld game console, released in 2006.
Dual-Stack Lite, an IPv6 transition technology.